Justice Hughes may refer to:

 Anthony Hughes, Lord Hughes of Ombersley (born 1948), Lord Justice of Appeal of the Court of Appeal of England and Wales
 Charles Evans Hughes (1862–1948), chief justice of the United States Supreme Court
 Frank Joseph Hughes (1883–1967), associate justice of the Supreme Court of Canada
 Henry P. Hughes (1904–1968), associate justice of the Wisconsin Supreme Court
 James P. Hughes (1874–1961), associate justice of the Supreme Court of Indiana
 Jefferson D. Hughes III (born 1952), associate justice of the Louisiana Supreme Court
 Lisabeth Tabor Hughes (born 1955), associate justice of the Kentucky Supreme Court
 Richard J. Hughes (1909–1992), chief justice of the New Jersey Supreme Court
 Samuel Hughes (judge) (1913–2002), justice of the Supreme Court of Ontario

See also
Judge Hughes (disambiguation)